Minister of Internal Security may refer to:

 The head of the Ministry of Public Security (disambiguation) in several countries
 A position in the board game Junta (game)